"I Went to a Marvellous Party" (sometimes known as "I've Been to a Marvellous Party") is a song with words and music by Noël Coward, written in 1938 and included in his Broadway revue, Set to Music, in which it was performed by Beatrice Lillie in January 1939. Lillie introduced the song to London audiences in June of that year in cabaret at the Café de Paris. It was later included in the revues All Clear (1939), Cowardy Custard (1972) and Oh, Coward! (1972). Both Lillie and Coward made recordings of the song, which is among his most popular.

Description
The lyric of I Went to a Marvellous Party is a first-person description of five parties attended by the singer on the French Riviera. The character of the song is humorous and giddy. It has been suggested that the activities described in the lyrics were typical of the "frantic, addleheaded search for amusement" of the Train bleu society, which flocked to the Riviera each summer in the 1920s and '30s.

In 1953 Coward described the background to the writing of the song:

Coward added, "This whole glittering episode was my original inspiration for 'I went to a Marvellous Party'. Beattie eventually sang the song in Set to Music wearing slacks, a fisherman's shirt, several ropes of pearls, a large sun-hat and dark glasses".

Although Coward wrote a melody for the song, the text is most often recited over a piano accompaniment. Out of Coward's approximately 300 songs, this is one of his most popular, ranking among the top 30 in royalty payments.

Performance history

Coward wrote the song with Lillie in mind, and included it in his revue Set to Music which opened at the Music Box Theatre in New York on 18 January 1939. The show was a much revised version of his 1932 West End show Words and Music.

Lillie introduced the song to London audiences in June 1939 in cabaret at the Café de Paris, and later in the year it was included in the revue All Clear at the Queen's Theatre. At the midnight gala at the Phoenix Theatre on 5 December 1969, marking Coward's seventieth birthday, Danny La Rue performed the song. Both the British and American retrospective Coward revues in 1972 included the number, performed by Patricia Routledge in Cowardy Custard and Roderick Cook in Oh, Coward!. The New York Times commented on the former that Routledge "incredible as it may seem, actually tops Beatrice Lillie's memorable performance".

Sheet music
The song is published separately as sheet music or in a number of collections, including the following:
The Noël Coward Songbook, London: Michael Joseph, 1953 
Noël Coward – Songs to Amuse, London: Chappell & Co. 1970 
A Noël Coward Gala, Volume 1, Chappell & Co./Random House, 1972(?) 
Cowardy Custard, John Hadfield, ed., London: Heinemann, 1973

Lyrics alone
The Lyrics of Noël Coward, London: Heinemann, 1965 
The Complete Lyrics of Noël Coward, Barry Day (ed.) London: Methuen, 1998.

Discography

Noël Coward
1939. Orchestra conductor, Emmet Dolan. LP AIE 2122.
1947. Noël Coward on the Air, piano accompaniment, Mantovani. Past CD 7840
1956. Noël Coward Album, piano accompaniment, Peter Matz. Sony CD MDK 47253 AAD; CD DRG 19028 (2003).

Other recordings
1939. Beatrice Lillie (A Marvellous Party), piano accompaniment, Will Irwin. AIE CD 006; PLATCD 118
1972. Patricia Routledge (Cowardy Custard), piano accompaniment, John Burrows. RCA LSO 60160 LP
1994. Kernan, Robertson, Gold (Noël/Cole-Let's Do It), Song CD 910
1998. The Divine Comedy (Twentieth-Century Blues: The Songs of Noel Coward)
2002. Elaine Stritch (At Liberty), DRG Theater 12994
2017. Beverly Knight [The Halcyon – TV Show]

Notes

Sources
 
 

1938 songs
Comedy songs
Songs about parties
Songs written by Noël Coward